Bermuda competed in the 2010 Commonwealth Games held in Delhi, India.

Aquatics

Swimming

Team Bermuda consists of 3 swimmers.

Keira Aitken, Roy-Allan Burch, Nick Thomson

Athletics

Team Bermuda consists of 2 athletes.

Tyrone Smith, Tre Houston

Shooting

Team Bermuda consists of 4 shooters.

Ross Roberts, Sinclair Raynor, Carl Reid, Nelson Simons

Squash

Team Bermuda consists of 1 squash player.

Nick Kyme

Tennis

Team Bermuda consists of 4 tennis players.

Gavin Manders, Tara Lambert, David Thomas, Jacklyn Lambert
Men

Women

Mixed

See also
2010 Commonwealth Games

References

Nations at the 2010 Commonwealth Games
Bermuda at the Commonwealth Games
2010 in Bermudian sport